Schalkwijk is the largest borough of Haarlem, Netherlands. It has about 30.000 inhabitants, and covers about 25% of the municipality of Haarlem.

Until 1963, Schalkwijk was a part of the municipality of Haarlemmerliede en Spaarnwoude. It consisted of two hamlets, North Schalkwijk and South Schalkwijk. The area is now covered by the residential area Schalkwijk that was mostly built in the 1960s.

Geography of Haarlem
Boroughs of the Netherlands